Lieutenant-General Sir Maurice Grove Taylor  (1881–1960) was a British Army officer.

Military career
After being educated at St. Mark's School, Windsor and the Royal Military Academy, Woolwich, Taylor was commissioned into the Royal Engineers on 2 May 1900. He married in 1906 and 1910 saw him as a captain. After attending the Staff College, Camberley, he was a staff officer with Scottish Command.

Initially serving as a railway transportation officer, he later saw action on the Western Front during First World War, for which he was appointed a Companion of the Distinguished Service Order. He was also mentioned in dispatches seven times during the war.

After the war he became Deputy Director of Movements at the War Office in 1919, Senior Instructor at the Staff College in 1921 and Assistant Quartermaster-General at Eastern Command in 1925. He went on to become commander of 166th (South Lancashire) Brigade in December 1927, General Officer Commanding the 46th (North Midland) Division in December 1932 and Major-General, Administration at Aldershot Command in April 1934.

After that he became Deputy Master-General of the Ordnance at the War Office in December 1937 and then Senior Military Adviser to the Ministry of Supply before retiring in 1941, during the Second World War.

Works

References

Bibliography

External links
Generals of World War II

1881 births
1960 deaths
Graduates of the Royal Military Academy, Woolwich
Graduates of the Staff College, Camberley
British Army lieutenant generals
People educated at the Imperial Services College
Knights Commander of the Order of the Bath
Companions of the Order of St Michael and St George
Companions of the Distinguished Service Order
Royal Engineers officers
British Army personnel of World War I
British Army generals of World War II
Academics of the Staff College, Camberley